HMS Torquay was a Type 12 Whitby-class frigate of the British Royal Navy. They were the first frigates to have the "V" form hull. This evolutionary design made it possible to be driven in head sea without the usual slamming which occurs with conventional destroyers of the time. Each frigate cost 3.5 million pounds and the first ship completed was Torquay in May 1956.

Design
The Whitbys were designed as specialist anti-submarine warships, intended to counter fast modern diesel-electric submarines. To meet these requirements, the Type 12s had a new hull form and, unlike the contemporary Type 41 anti-aircraft and Type 61 air direction frigates, were powered by steam turbines.

The ships were powered by the new Y-100 machinery in which the ship's boilers and steam turbines were designed as a closely integrated set of machinery to increase efficiency. Crew was about 189 when operated as a leader and 152 as an ordinary ship.

A twin 4.5-inch (113 mm) Mark 6 gun mount was fitted forward, with 350 rounds of ammunition carried, with close-in armament of a stabilised STAAG (Stabilised Tachymetric Anti-Aircraft Gun) twin Bofors 40 mm L/60 gun mount aft. The design anti-submarine armament consisted of twelve 21-inch torpedo-tubes (eight fixed and two twin rotating mounts) for Mark 20E Bidder homing anti-submarine torpedoes, backed up by two Limbo anti-submarine mortars fitted aft. The Bidder homing torpedoes proved unsuccessful however, being too slow to catch modern submarines, and the torpedo tubes were soon removed.

The ship was fitted with a Type 293Q surface/air search radar on the foremast, with a Type 277 height-finding radar on a short mast forward of the foremast. A Mark 6M fire control system (including a Type 275 radar) for the 4.5 inch guns was mounted above the ship's bridge, while a Type 974 navigation radar was also fitted. The ship's sonar fit consisted of Type 174 search, Type 170 fire control sonar for Limbo and a Type 162 sonar for classifying targets on the sea floor.

Operational Service

Torquay was laid down at Harland & Wolff's Belfast shipyard on 11 March 1953. The ship was launched  on 1 July 1954, and completed on 10 May 1956.

On commissioning Torquay joined the 5th Frigate Squadron based at Portsmouth, becoming leader of the squadron on 28 August that year. She left for the Mediterranean at the end of October and took part in the Suez operation in November 1956. In December Torquay carried out patrols off Cyprus, and remained in the Mediterranean in the early part of 1957, returning to Portsmouth on 16 May 1957. In July 1958, Torquay took part in Operation Fortitude, when the aircraft carrier  supported an airlift of British troops to Jordan following a request by King Hussein of Jordan more military assistance in response to unrest following the formation of the United Arab Republic by Egypt and Syria and the 14 July Revolution in Iraq.

Between 1963 and 1971 Torquay was one of the frigates allocated to the Dartmouth Training Squadron and between 1972 and 1985 Torquay served as a navigation training ship based in Portsmouth. In 1971 the ship was refitted with a solid main mast (as opposed to a lattice mast) and a large training navigation room was built where the forward set of triple-barrelled mortars used to be located (leaving one set of mortars). She was also fitted to undertake trials of CAAIS (Computer Assisted Action Information System). Torquay attended the 1977 Silver Jubilee Fleet Review off Spithead when she was part of the 2nd Frigate Squadron.

At the time she was the longest serving ship of her class and the oldest frigate in the fleet. She was sold for scrap in 1987 and left Portsmouth on 1 July 1987 to be broken up in Barcelona, Spain.

Notable individuals who commanded Torquay at some point in her history include Peter Berger, Fabian Malbon and John McAnally.

References

Sources

External links

 

Ships built in Belfast
Whitby-class frigates
1954 ships
Ships built by Harland and Wolff